Antaeotricha lepidocarpa is a moth in the family Depressariidae. It was described by Edward Meyrick in 1930. It is found in Brazil (Para).

The wingspan is about 19 mm. The forewings are rather dark fuscous with a faint purplish tinge and the extreme costal edge whitish. There are three obscure darker slightly sinuate oblique transverse lines, the first from before one-third of the costa to beyond the middle of the dorsum, the second from beyond the middle of the costa to four-fifths of the dorsum, the third from three-fourths of the costa to the tornus, edged posteriorly with a slight whitish tinge, the second discal stigma forming a dark fuscous dot on the second line, preceded by a whitish dot. There is a marginal series of indistinct dark fuscous dots around the apical part of the costa and termen. The hindwings are dark grey with an elongate-oval blotch of pale greyish-ochreous modified scales in the middle of the disc, connected with the costa by a pale area. The costal area from the base to two-thirds forms a broad expansion edged with whitish scales.

References

Moths described in 1930
lepidocarpa
Moths of South America
Taxa named by Edward Meyrick